Eagle Vision may refer to:

 Eagle Vision, a car model, Vision, made by Chrysler under the brand Eagle
 Eagle Vision (company), a Canadian TV and film production company
 Vision of eagles, see eagle eye

See also
 Bird vision
 Eye of the Eagle (disambiguation)
 Eagle Eye (disambiguation)